Letters Written in France (1790–1796) is a series of letters written by English writer Helen Maria Williams. Williams wrote eight volumes of letters describing her firsthand experience of the French Revolution for British audiences, of which the first volume, describing the summer of 1790, was the most famous and influential. Williams expressed consistent confidence in the revolutionary ideals of liberty and equality, even after the development of violence and war in France.

Background
In the 1780s, Williams became "a literary star of the first magnitude" in England, known for her poetry and novels, which used the aesthetics of sensibility to advocate for social reform. She was prominent in the social circles of Dissenters and Whigs, connected to figures like Andrew Kippis, Anna Laetitia Barbauld and William Godwin. She campaigned against the slave trade, and against laws like the Test Act which restricted the civil rights of non-Anglicans.

Some time in 1785 or 1786, Williams and her sister Cecilia began taking French lessons from Monique du Fossé. Monique was living in England with her daughter while her husband, Augustin du Fossé, was in prison in France for having married her against his father's will. Augustin's father, a Baron, used a lettre de cachet to bar him from inheriting his family's aristocratic estate. His father died in 1787, and after the fall of the Bastille in 1789, du Fossé reclaimed his inheritance.

Williams and her sister arrived in Paris for a tour of France on 13 July 1790, the day before the first Fête de la Fédération. The two travelled through France for two months, visiting Monique and Augustin du Fossé, and returned to England in September 1790. Williams returned to France in 1791 for a longer stay, which became a permanent move. Her last visit to England was a brief trip in 1792. In Paris, her apartment became "an important meeting place for French, American, and British radicals," and Williams was associated with the Girondins.

Williams was arrested under the Law of Suspects on 12 October 1793, along with her mother and sister Cecilia. They were imprisoned, until a nephew of Monique du Fossé arranged their freedom in November. Many of Williams' close friends in France were executed for opposition to the Jacobins. In April 1794, Robespierre ordered all foreigners to leave the capital; Williams fled to Switzerland for six months. She returned after Robespierre's execution.

Contents
Williams' discussion of French social reform was unflaggingly optimistic, expressing her faith in the ideals of liberty and equality and her excitement that these principles could eliminate tyranny around the world. She expressed frequent hopes that England would be inspired to social reform, and especially that slavery would be abolished. Early on, these hopes were shared by other English writers, but after a series of massacres within France, and wars between France and other nations, Williams became unusual for remaining committed to revolutionary ideals. She never endorsed violence, but saw it as a perversion of revolutionary ideals, often attributable to Robespierre's hypocrisy and corruption.

Volume one
The first volume was published in 1790 with the full title of Letters written in France: in the summer 1790, to a friend in England: containing various anecdotes relative to the French revolution; and memoirs of Mons. and Madame du F---- (Fossé). The twenty-six letters cover Williams' visits to various locations associated with the Revolution, a true history of the du Fossé family and her own personal views alongside sociological observations. The first volume can be roughly divided into three unequal parts:

Letters I–XV: Williams' narrative begins at a mass at Notre-Dame de Paris on the eve of the Fête de la Fédération, a celebration to commemorate the first anniversary of the Storming of the Bastille. From here the letters describe figures of the Revolution; they also chart her visits to sites that include the ruins of the Bastille, the National Assembly and the Palace of Versailles. It finishes several weeks later with a journey from Paris to Rouen. 
Letter XVI–XXII: Williams offers the history of the du Fossé family. It chronicles the younger du Fossé's decision to go against the will of his father in his choice of whom to marry, and the various abuses he suffers by him thereafter as he tries to escape his strict control. A true history with the 'air of romance', it serves as a fable for the Revolution.
Letters XXIII–XXVI: The narrative returns to the eyewitness epistolary form with a focus on England, to which Williams prepares to return, and then does.

Volumes two through eight
The subsequent volumes, published by G.G. & J. Robinson, continued to report on Williams' experience in France through the year 1796. Occasionally, these letters re-describe and elaborate on important events in order to counter misrepresentations that circulated in England.
 Letters from France: Containing Many New Anecdotes Relative to the French Revolution, and the Present State of French Manners (1792) contains twenty-four letters from September 1791 to early 1792. Despite hints of discord, Williams maintains an optimistic tone and reassures readers that there is little risk of civil disorder.
 Letters from France: Containing a Great Variety of Interesting and Original Information Concerning the Most Important Events that Have Lately Occurred in that Country, and Particularly Respecting the Campaign of 1792 (1793) was published in two volumes. It was published without direct attribution to Williams, though it was expected that readers would recognize them as hers.
 Volume one contains seven letters and an appendix. Only the first letter, written after the execution of Louis XVI in January 1793, is by Williams. The other six are by her partner John Hurford Stone. The volume describes events from 10 August 1792 to January 1793. Williams condemns recent massacres and insists that anarchy will not last, and that the greater ideals of the revolution will still triumph.
 Volume two contains five letters from February to May 1793. The fifth letter is by Thomas Christie. The letters describe the execution of Louis XVI in more detail, and France's ongoing wars, but reiterate Williams' hope that revolutionary ideals will eventually overcome the violence. Although Williams witnessed the storming of the Tuileries, she does not describe it in her letters.
 Letters Containing a Sketch of the Politics of France, from the Thirty-first of May 1793, till the Twenty-eighth of July 1794, and of the Scenes which have Passed in the Prisons of Paris (1795) was published in two volumes.
 Volume one contains nine letters and three appendices, some written while Williams is a political prisoner, and some written from Switzerland. She describes the assassination of Jean-Paul Marat and the executions of Charlotte Corday and Marie Antoinette. The execution of Robespierre reinvigorates Williams' optimism that liberty will triumph in France.
 Volume two contains seven letters and three appendices. Williams describes the executions of Jacques Hébert, Georges Danton, and Camille Desmoulins, and the insincerity of the Festival of the Supreme Being. She is briefly confined as a political prisoner. She concludes with continuing optimism that the revolution is exiting a dark period.
 Letters Containing a Sketch of the Scenes which Passed in Various Departments of France during the Tyranny of Robespierre, and of the Events which Took Place in Paris on the 28th of July 1794 (1796) consists of seven letters re-describing events from 1794, including the execution of Danton and her exile from France, and attributing all of the horrors of recent events to Robespierre, without whom the revolution can now flourish.
 Letters Containing a Sketch of the Politics of France, from the Twenty-eighth of July 1794, to the Establishment of the Constitution in 1795, and of the Scenes which have Passed in the Prisons of Paris (1796) contains nine letters describing events from the fall of Robespierre to the rise the Directory. Williams describes ongoing internal conflicts, placing her own hopes in the French army.

Style
Williams herself has been increasingly interpreted as a Romantic writer, whose letters combine aesthetics and politics. Williams promotes sensibility over rationality. Unlike some Romantic poets, Williams does not seek to transcend history, but to shape an emotional response to it. She uses emotional stories and poetic images to inspire strong feelings of political sympathy for social equality. She especially uses images of nature and light, and presents the revolution itself as a spectacle that unites the usually-opposed aesthetic categories of the sublime and the beautiful by making the awe-inspiring events open to participation from their viewers.

Epistolary writing was a popular literary genre in the late eighteenth century, and considered particularly suitable to women writers. Mary Wortley Montagu's Turkish Embassy Letters (1763), for example, exemplified the expected combination of anecdotes, reflection, and elegant prose. Unlike other travel writing, Williams does not say much about details like her lodging or food, instead emphasizing important events as in a historical narrative. The epistolary form allows Williams to structure her history as individual anecdotes and descriptions, and allows any omissions to seem like a natural result of her personal experience.

Publication and reception

The first volume of Williams' letters was well-received in 1790. It was reviewed favorably in most major periodicals. Williams' pro-French sentiment was often noted, but not challenged; both her facts and her optimism were acceptable within English political discourse. Her letters were published two weeks after Edmund Burke's famous Reflections on the Revolution in France, which spurred a pamphlet war that came to be known as the Revolution Controversy. Although Williams was not responding directly to Burke— she completed her manuscript before his work was published— her Letters were seen as a rebuttal to his fearmongering. Williams' letters were widely read and cited during these debates, especially for their value as detailed eyewitness accounts. Three foreign editions were published in 1791: one in Dublin, one in America, and a French translation published in Paris. The primary London edition was also reprinted four times between 1790 and 1796.

Williams' reputation gradually waned after 1790, as British sentiment became more strongly opposed to the revolution. In 1791, her last year in England, she was still popular enough to host literary salons, and reviews in all journals were polite about partial political disagreements. However, there were some tensions in her personal acquaintance (particularly Hester Thrale Piozzi) when she returned briefly in 1792, and the second volume of Letters published in 1792 met with a lukewarm reception. Critics expressed the prevailing British view that social progress in France had been obtained at too high a cost, and suggested that Williams' emotion— previously a sign of her elevated sensibility— was now clouding her judgment.

The September Massacres in 1792, and the execution of Louis XVI in January 1793, firmly ended British support for the revolution and heightened political tensions within France, rendering Williams' further publication risky. To avoid arrest in France for her criticisms of the Jacobins, in 1793 Williams published the next two volumes of Letters anonymously. Her authorship was an open secret, and she was explicitly identified by reviewers, as were the two men who contributed additional letters to one of these volumes. These volumes were not warmly received in England, and Williams' political positions were seen as too extreme in England, even as she was endangered for being too moderate in France. Williams was the subject of a book-length rebuttal by Laetitia Matilda Hawkins. In Hawkins' Letters on the Female Mind, Its Powers and Pursuits. Addressed to Miss H. M. Williams, with Particular Reference to Her Letters from France (1793), Hawkins argued that women were unfit for politics, and that poetry was a more appropriate sphere for the expression of sensibility.

The next four volumes were written and published as a set, the first two appearing in 1795 and the last two in 1796. These volumes were widely reviewed, with a polarized response: liberal journals regarded them positively, while conservative journals used the Letters to denounce the revolution itself. This series, which attempted to retroactively capture the Reign of Terror, was also criticized for being disorganized and haphazard in its inclusion of documents, the epistolary mode conflicting with the book's historical scope.

Online text
The eight volumes are listed with serial numbers #1 through #8. In fact, #1 appeared in 1790 without a number, and Roman volume numbers began to appear from #2 (II) in 1792, making a fresh start with "I" and "II" for the two volumes published in 1795. The last two volumes then appeared in 1796 as III and IV.

All links are to Archive.org except for #7, which is only available at Google Books. The first four volumes are not available as first editions.

1. Letters written in France, in the summer of 1790 etc. (1790), 2nd ed. 1791

2. Letters from France: containing many new anecdotes etc., Vol. II (1792), 3d ed. 1796

3. Letters from France: containing a great variety of interesting and original information etc., Vol. III (1793), 2nd ed. 1796

4. Letters from France: containing a great variety of interesting and original information etc., Vol. IV (1793), 2nd ed. 1796

5. Letters containing a sketch of the politics of France, from the thirty-first of May 1793 etc., Vol. I (1795)

6. Letters containing a sketch of the politics of France, from the thirty-first of May 1793 etc., Vol. II (1795)

7. Letters containing a sketch of the scenes which passed in various departments of France etc., Vol. III (1796)

8. Letters containing a sketch of the politics of France, from the thirty-first of May 1793 etc., Vol. IV (1796)

Citations

References 

 
 
 

1790 non-fiction books
Book series introduced in 1790
Collections of letters
British non-fiction literature
Books about the French Revolution
Books about France